HMS Mourne (K261) was a  of the Royal Navy (RN). Mourne was built to the RN's specifications as a Group II River-class frigate. She served in the North Atlantic during World War II.

As a River-class frigate, Mourne was one of 151 frigates launched between 1941 and 1944 for use as anti-submarine convoy escorts, named after rivers in the United Kingdom. The ships were designed by naval engineer William Reed, of Smith's Dock Company of South Bank-on-Tees, to have the endurance and anti-submarine capabilities of the  sloops, while being quick and cheap to build in civil dockyards using the machinery (e.g. reciprocating steam engines instead of turbines) and construction techniques pioneered in the building of the s. Its purpose was to improve on the convoy escort classes in service with the Royal Navy at the time, including the Flower class.

After commissioning in April 1943, Mourne served in convoy escort missions and participated in anti-submarine warfare exercises off Lough Foyle and Larne.

Following the Normandy landings of Operation Overlord, Mourne was deployed to the western entrance of the English Channel as a screening operation, serving as part of the 5th Escort Group. At 13:45 on 15 June 1944, the bow of Mourne was hit by a GNAT torpedo fired by German submarine U-767, causing an ignition in the ship magazine. The ship was sunk with the loss of 111 lives and 27 survivors.

References

External links 
 
 

 

1942 ships
River-class frigates of the Royal Navy
World War II frigates of the United Kingdom
Ships sunk by German submarines in World War II
World War II shipwrecks in the English Channel
Naval magazine explosions